The Type 67 is a general-purpose machine gun, chambered in 7.62×54mmR used by the Chinese People's Liberation Army.

History
The Type 67 machine gun was developed as a lightweight replacement for the Type 53 (SG43) and Type 57 (SGM) medium 7.62 mm machine guns in 1959. The first tests for the Type 67 started in 1963. Research on the weapon was led by Dr. Duo Ying Jian from the Beijing Industrial Technology Academy. After Soviet-Chinese relations began to break down, there were concerns that further technological assistance would not be rendered, including supplying them with Soviet-made PKMs.

The first combat use of the Type 67 was with Mujahideen forces fighting in Afghanistan fighting against pro-Soviet forces in 1980. These found their way through smuggling in Pakistani soil. In the Syrian Civil War, the Type 67 is found in use with Syrian opposition forces fighting against government forces from 2015. It is suggested these were likely captured from Syrian troops. It has also been used in the Yemeni Civil War against the Houthis.

Design history
According to a United States Army Materiel Command analysis, the Type 67 uses the DP trigger mechanism, the quick-change barrel of the SG-43, a gas regulator similar to the RPD, the ZB vz. 30 bolt mechanism, and a modified Maxim-type feed mechanism.

The furniture was made in wood with the integral non-detachable bipod attached to a gas tube. For using the Type 67 at long range, a tripod can be used when needed. The Type 67 was supposed to be used with a tripod, but Chinese engineers studied a captured M60 GPMG from American-led military forces in the Vietnam War. Further design revisions were made where the bipod was made standard to be used.

Since 1967, the Type 67 has gone through two model modifications and improvements, with the newer models designated Type 67-1 and Type 67-2.

Variants

 Type 67-1: This has a non-fluted barrel with the bipod clamped to the barrel below the front. This can be removed. Furniture is made from plastic.
 Type 67-2: Uses the same barrel, but lighter. Tripod is used instead of a bipod, made from stamped steel instead of steel tubing. The gunner can attach a telescopic or night sight. On late production models, the AA sight base is removed.

Users

 
 
 
 
 
 
 
 
 
: Palestine Liberation Organization
 : Used by the SAA and by Free Syrian Army
 
 
 : The Vietcong and the North Vietnamese Army.

Non-state actors 

 
  Lebanese Communist Party/Popular Guard militia.

References

7.62×54mmR machine guns
Infantry weapons of the Cold War
Cold War weapons of China
Weapons and ammunition introduced in 1967
General-purpose machine guns
Machine guns of the People's Republic of China
Norinco